Discovery Village is located in Gig Harbor, Washington.  It is an interactive hands-on museum and learning center for children aged 0 to 9 years.  This museum has a large pacific northwest playground, indoor sand box, gemstone treasure hunt and dramatic play village.  Discovery Village opened in 2010.

External links
Discovery Village website

Museums established in 2010
Museums in Pierce County, Washington
2010 establishments in Washington (state)
Children's museums in Washington (state)
Gig Harbor, Washington